Ceallasaigh Mòr (or Keallasay More) is a low-lying island in Loch Maddy off North Uist in the Outer Hebrides of Scotland. This an area of shallow lagoons filled and drained by the tides each day. Ceallasaigh Beag lies to the south and these two islets are connected by a narrow strip of sand at low tide. Ceallasaigh Mòr may also join mainland North Uist near Bràigh Cheallasaigh at some stages of the tide.

Footnotes

Uist islands